is a passenger railway station in located in the city of Hikone,  Shiga Prefecture, Japan, operated by the private railway operator Ohmi Railway.

Lines
Fujitec-mae Station is served by the Ohmi Railway Main Line, and is located 2.3 rail kilometers from the terminus of the line at Maibara Station.

Station layout
The station consists of a single side platform with a length of 45 meters, which can accommodate trains consisting of three carriages or less. The station building is unattended.

Adjacent stations

History
The station opened on 18 March 2006.

Passenger statistics
In fiscal 2019, the station was used by an average of 228 passengers daily (boarding passengers only).

Surrounding area
Fujitec head office

See also
List of railway stations in Japan

References

External links

 Ohmi Railway official site

Railway stations in Shiga Prefecture
Railway stations in Japan opened in 2006
Hikone, Shiga